Bostobrick is a village located on Tyringham Road in northern New South Wales, Australia. As of 2016, It has a population of 136. Bostobrick was first settled in 1857, when cedar loggers came to harvest the timber in what was then known as 'Bostobrick Scrub'.

References

 

1857 establishments in Australia
Localities in New South Wales
Populated places established in 1857
Mid North Coast